Come l'acqua is the ninth studio album by Italian pop singer Mango, released in 1992.

The album contains "Mediterraneo", one of the most successful singles by Mango.

The string sections were recorded at the Abbey Road Studios in London.

Track listing

Personnel 

Mango: vocals, choir
Celso Valli: keyboards, synth bass
Pino Palladino: bass
Ian Kewley: keyboards
Lele Melotti: drums
Paolo Costa: bass
Graziano Accinni: guitar
Beppe Gemelli: drums
Mauro Paoluzzi: guitar
Rocco Petruzzi: keyboards
Manu Katché: drums
Dominic Miller: guitar
Richard Galliano: accordion
Paolo Bighignoli: oboe
Paolo Grazia: bassoon
Silvia Valente, Giorgio Vanni: choir

References 

Mango albums
1992 albums